The Green Party of Texas is the state party organization for Texas of the Green Party of the United States. The party was founded as the electoral arm of the political movements for grassroots democracy, social justice, ecological wisdom, and peace/nonviolence. The aim of the movement is to bring change to the Government such that it is brought in line with the Global Greens Charter.

The Texas Green Party has retroactively gained ballot access through 2026 via the passage and signing of HB-2504 in 2019, from having obtained 2% of the statewide vote for Railroad Commissioner in 2016. Greens continue to elect local officeholders in Texas.

History
The Green Party of Texas began to organize a serious, statewide, grassroots effort in the late 1990s. Small, active Green groups existed in large cities throughout the state (particularly Houston, Dallas and Austin) before this time, but Ralph Nader's 1996 campaign helped spur the growth of the Green Party of Texas.

2000
Ballot access was achieved in Texas by the Green Party, which allowed Ralph Nader and the names of statewide and local Green candidates to appear on the ballot alongside Democrats, Republicans, Libertarian and Independents.

The drive in 2000 was achieved using volunteers with a help from paid petitioners, most of them Greens from other states; the cost of the drive was around $80,000; over 30,000 of those signatures were collected in the last two weeks alone. The goal for signatures was about 64,000 (based on the gubernatorial election of 1998, including a sizable cushion for invalid signatures); over 76,000 qualified signatures were collected. Three Green Party candidates reached the required 5 percent threshold for one statewide candidate to achieve in order to retain ballot access for 2002 (the highest was Ben Levy for State Supreme Court, who received 9.7 percent with 451,338 votes).

2002
Having retained access to the ballot for this year, the Green Party of Texas fielded 28 candidates to appear on the ballot around the state, in addition to candidates for several local races. None of the statewide candidates achieved the required 5 percent of the vote, because of one-punch, straight-ticket voting, so the Green Party lost ballot access for 2004. Of the statewide Green candidates, Lesley Nicole Ramsey got 21.7% with 63,871 votes for State Board of Education, District 10; Ruben Reyes got 1.72% with 77,177 votes for Comptroller of Public Accounts; several candidates for statewide judge seats received votes within that range.

2004
Since ballot access was lost, the Green Party of Texas would have had to gather in well in excess of  45,540 signatures (1% of the votes cast for governor in 2002) in order to regain ballot access. They attempted to mount an all volunteer effort, but fell far short of the needed signature collection.  At the time, the leadership was unaware of the costs of the 2000 petition drive as they were told it was a volunteer effort and only years later were the costs of 2000 ballot access discovered.

2006
The deadline for petition signature gathering ended after only 75 days for the Green Party of Texas on May 29, 2006. The party did not reach the goal of 75,000 signatures or the legal requirement of 45,540 signatures. The actual number collected, mostly by volunteers, was about 27,000 statewide. This election cycle included competition for signatures from two independent candidates (Kinky Friedman and Carole Strayhorn). Many registered voters had already voted in the primaries, meaning that they could not sign petitions for other candidates; remaining eligible people may have been confused by the fact that they were not allowed to sign a petition for more than one independent, nor for more than one non-primary party, but they could sign one of each. The official language on the petitions from the Election Code adds to voter intimidation and confusion.

While they did not gain ballot access, the Green Party was required by the Texas Secretary of State to have declared by January 2 what candidates it would have on its convention ballots, which decide who they would run in November if it had gained ballot access. The party announced candidates seeking nomination in about 22 statewide and local races. The highest offices its candidates would have sought were governor and a U.S. Senate seat. Charles Waterbury became a write-in candidate for Texas Supreme Court. A number of local offices were also sought, including a county commissioner's seat in Bexar County, Texas. Further information can be found at TXGreens.org.

2010
The Green Party's efforts to get its candidates on the ballot for the 2010 elections was successful. Nearly 92,000 petition signatures were gathered in support of granting the Green Party ballot access. The petitions were immediately challenged by the Texas Democratic Party.

The challenge was based on Texas's corporate contribution bans, but corporations are allowed to donate for administrative costs, which ballot access is according to the author of the legislation enacting this restriction, in his testimony to the Texas Legislature.  The petition drive had been funded by one Republican through a 501c(4), which was presented to the Green Party leadership as a non-incorporated entity.

The news media circus that resulted was based on a press release and blogs put out by a group started merely to disseminate propaganda around this lawsuit. That site no longer exists, likely due to a settlement the Texas Democratic Party (TDP) accepted from the Republican operatives named as defendants - a $760,000 deal reported only as $250,000 by the TDP.
The court challenge resulted in the Green Party candidates being allowed to remain on the ballot.

In 2010, in the election for Comptroller of Public Accounts, Ed Lindsay received more than 6 percent of the vote, which allowed the Green Party to stay on the ballot for the Presidential election in Texas in 2012.

2012 candidates
In 2012, with an "Occupy the ballot" campaign, the Green Party of Texas ran a record number of candidates, including for president (Jill Stein), U.S. Senate (David Collins), Supreme Court of Texas (Charles Waterbury for Place 4 and Jim Chisholm for Place 6), and railroad commissioner (Chris Kennedy for the post normally renewed this cycle and Josh Wendel for the unexpired term), as well as 13 U.S. House candidates, 13 Texas House candidates, two Texas Senate candidates, and nominees for more than a half dozen other positions. Statewide judicial races secured the party access for 2014.

Elected officials
The following are known elected Green Party officeholders in Texas.

Current officials:
 George Altgelt, City Council District 7, Laredo (through Nov. 2020)

Past officials:
 Debbie Russell, School Board, Del Valle I.S.D. Austin
 La'Shadion Shemwell, City Council District 1, McKinney
 David Lanman, mayor, Marfa
 Bob Brewer, city council, Ward 5, Alpine
 Flynn Wright, city council, Sommerville
 George Rice, water board, Bexar County

Presidential nominee results

References

External links
 

TX
Political parties in Texas